Stubbs is an English surname derived from the Middle English nickname Stubb. It may refer to the following notable people:

Alan Stubbs (born 1971), English football player
Christopher B. "Stubb" Stubblefield (1931–1995), American barbecue restaurateur and chef
Christopher Stubbs (born 1958), American astrophysicist
Charles William Stubbs (1845–1912), English clergyman
Drew Stubbs (born 1984), American baseball player
Wing Commander Duncan Stubbs (born 1961), British RAF musical director
Eddie Stubbs (born 1961), American radio disc jockey
Edward J. Stubbs (1833–1887), American shipwright
Frank Edward Stubbs (1888–1915), World War I recipient of the Victoria Cross
Franklin Stubbs (born 1960), American baseball player
Garrett Stubbs (born 1993), American professional baseball player
George Stubbs (1724–1806), English painter
 Hal Clement (Harry Clement Stubbs, 1922–2003), American science fiction writer
 Harry Stubbs (actor) (1874–1950), English-born American character actor
Imogen Stubbs (born 1961), British actress
John Heath-Stubbs (1918–2006), British poet and translator
John Stubbs (disambiguation), multiple people
Levi Stubbs (1936–2008), singer with The Four Tops
Lewis Stubbs (1878–1958), Canadian politician
Marie Stubbs (born 1939), British educator
Philip Stubbs (c.1555–1610), English pamphleteer
Ray Stubbs (born 1956), British sports broadcaster
Reginald Edward Stubbs (1876–1947), governor of Hong Kong
Rennae Stubbs (born 1971), Australian tennis player
Richard Stubbs (born 1957), Australian radio presenter and comedian
Stephen Stubbs (born 1951), American lutenist and director
Una Stubbs (1937–2021), British actress and dancer
Walter R. Stubbs (born 1858), 18th governor of Kansas
William Stubbs (1825–1901), English historian and bishop of Oxford
William Carter Stubbs (1843–1924), American agricultural chemist

References

English-language surnames